A Mother of Men is a 1914 American silent film produced by Sid Films and distributed by Warner's Features. It was directed by Sidney Olcott with Valentine Grant and Arthur Donaldson in the leading roles.

Cast
Valentine Grant - 
 Arthur Donaldson -
James Vincent - 
 Walter Chapin - 
 Roy Cheldon -
 Sidney Olcott -

Production notes
A Mother of Men was shot in Jacksonville, Fla.

External links

 A Mother of Men website dedicated to Sidney Olcott

1914 films
American silent feature films
Films directed by Sidney Olcott
1910s war drama films
American war drama films
American black-and-white films
1914 drama films
1910s American films
Silent American drama films
Silent war drama films